Zimbabwean women's cricket team toured Bangladesh in second half of November 2015. Zimbabweans arrived Bangladesh on 15 November. Tour consists of a series of two Twenty20.

1st T20

2nd T20

References 

2015 in Bangladeshi cricket
2015 in Zimbabwean cricket
Zimbabwean cricket tours of Bangladesh
International cricket competitions in 2015–16
Zimbabwean cricket seasons from 2000–01
2015 in women's cricket
Zim 2015
2015 in Bangladeshi women's sport
2015 in Zimbabwean women's sport